Sunshine on Leith is the second studio album by Scottish folk rock duo The Proclaimers, released in August 1988 through Chrysalis Records. The record spawned four singles: "I'm Gonna Be (500 Miles)", which topped charts in Australia, New Zealand and Iceland; "Sunshine on Leith", a ballad that has become an anthem for Scottish football club Hibernian F.C.; the No. 3 Australian hit "I'm on My Way"; and the Australian-exclusive "Then I Met You". The non-single "Cap in Hand" also came to prominence in 2014 with the Scottish Independence referendum.

Sunshine on Leith marked a departure from the minimalist acoustics of the group's 1987 debut This Is the Story, toward a rock-oriented full band sound, and was a major worldwide hit, particular in Australia where it was described as the band's "biggest success", reaching No. 2 in the ARIA Charts and being 1989's 12th highest-seller. The album peaked at No. 3 and No. 6 in New Zealand and the United Kingdom respectively, while also charting in Canada and Sweden, ultimately selling over 2 million copies worldwide.

Recording 
Sunshine on Leith was recorded at Chipping Norton Recording Studios in Oxfordshire, England, and was produced by Pete Wingfield. The recording for Sunshine on Leith marked the first time that The Proclaimers had worked with a band, having recruited a studio lineup including Fairport Convention drummer Dave Mattacks and Steve Shaw of Dexys Midnight Runners.

Music and style

Musical style 
At variance with the stripped-back acoustic nature of the band's 1987 debut effort This Is The Story, Sunshine on Leith embraced the rock-angled sound of a full band. Describing the album's musical style, Chris Heim of the Chicago Tribune opined that Sunshine on Leith had a "lively folk-rock sound with hints of Scottish airs, American country and worldwide rock-n-roll [...] a synthesis [the band] have thoughtfully forged from their respect for their own culture and their interest in American music". Rhino Insider characterized the record's sound as "stripped down pub-rock [...] enlivened by Scottish folk influences".

Lyrics and themes 
Many of Sunshine on Leith'''s songs narrated familial bliss, such as "Then I Met You" and "Sean", an ode to fatherhood. "Cap in Hand" and "What Do You Do?" relayed the band's Scottish nationalist convictions.

Alluding to the record's moods, Tom Demalton of AllMusic identified "a thread of optimism that runs through most of the album", with Mike Bohem of Los Angeles Times similarly detailing that the band's blend of "ambitious, catchy melody with an earthy, unbridled approach to singing helps the Proclaimers put across songs of unabashed joy".

 Critical reception 
AnalyticsSunshine on Leith has enjoyed positive critical reception. In a four-and-a-half out of five star review, Tom Demalton of AllMusic proclaimed the record to be "highly listenable and thoroughly engaging blend of folk and pop".

Bill Wyman of the Chicago Reader remarked that Sunshine on Leith was a "magnificent" and "almost flawless" record.Rhino Insider remarked of a reissued edition that Sunshine on Leith offered "plenty more to enjoy" beyond the lead single, containing "fine originals" "("Oh Jean", "I'm On My Way") and "appealing covers" ("My Old Friend the Blues"), and opined the album to be "invigorating from beginning to end".

In April 1989, Steve Hochman of Rolling Stone lauded Sunshine on Leith “a wonderfully guileless treasure of an album”.

 Accolades Sunshine on Leith was ranked No. 12 out of the 50 top-selling albums for 1989 in Australia. In October 2003, The Scotsman ranked Sunshine on Leith No. 25 on their "100 Best Scottish Albums" list, the second of two Proclaimers' albums featured.

 Commercial performance 
In Australia, Sunshine on Leith has been certified 2× platinum by the ARIA, 1989's 12th biggest seller behind Guns N' Roses' Appetite for Destruction. The band's Craig Reid divulged that the album's Australian smash, retrospectively dubbed "Proclaimermania", in 1989 was "the biggest success we’ve ever had anywhere". The album reached No. 2, while "I'm Gonna Be (500 Miles)" topped the singles chart, Craig Reid describing this popularity as "madness".Sunshine on Leith failed to chart in the US on its original release. Regardless, in June 1989, SPIN Magazine ranked the record No. 16 in the US for the "Top 30 Albums Played on College Radio". The selection of "I'm Gonna Be (500 Miles)" for the soundtrack of the 1993 film Benny & Joon saw the single peak at No. 3 on the US Billboard Hot 100 that year, with Sunshine on Leith peaking on the Billboard 200 Albums at No. 31 on 7 August 1993, and selling over 696,000 copies in the US as of 2001.

At the time of June 2009, Sunshine on Leith had shifted over two million units globally.

 Promotion and touring Sunshine on Leiths 1988 release was followed by a tour, complete with an electric backing band. The 1989 leg of the tour saw the band perform to a crowd of 65,000 at the 1989 Glastonbury Festival.

Stateside promotion for the record included US talk-show performances, inclusive of a 21 March 1989 appearance on Late Night with David Letterman.

The 1993 vogue of Sunshine on Leith and "I'm Gonna Be (500 Miles)" in the United States saw The Proclaimers perform at Madison Square Garden for the Z100 Birthday on 28 July 1993, alongside Terence Trent D'Arby, 10,000 Maniacs, Duran Duran and headliners Bon Jovi.

 Legacy and influence 
Sunshine on Leith, a stage musical spotlighting the songs of The Proclaimers, was named in renown of the album and title track. The TMAAward-winning musical debuted in 2007, and the film adaptation, starring Peter Mullan and Jane Horrocks, was completed in 2013, grossing over US$4.7 million after debuting at No. 3 in the UK box office.

Noted for its Scottish nationalist tenets, the album track "Cap in Hand" enjoyed a remarkable vogue in 2014 owing to the Scottish Independence Referendum, reaching No. 6 in Scotland and No. 62 on the UK Singles Chart.

Track listing

Personnel
Adapted from Sunshine on Leith liner notes.The ProclaimersCraig Reid – vocals, percussion
Charlie Reid – vocals, acoustic guitarsAdditional personnelJerry Donahue – acoustic and electric guitars
Gerry Hogan – steel guitar
Steve Shaw – violin, mandolin (tracks 14, 16), piano (track 16)
Stuart Nisbet – pennywhistle, mandolin, guitars (track 13), pedal steel guitar (track 13)
Dave Whetstone – melodeon
Pete Wingfield – keyboards, organ (track 16), bass synth (track 16)
Phil Cranham – bass guitar
Dave Mattacks, Paul Robinson – drums, percussion
Keith Burns – drums (track 13)
Niko Bruce – double bass (track 13)
Paul Townsend – bass guitar (tracks 14, 15)
Nico Ramsden – electric guitar (tracks 14, 15)
Judd Lander – harmonica (track 14)Technical'''
Barry Hammond – engineer
Beeg Al, Chris Birkett – engineer (track 13)
Richard Hollywood – engineer (tracks 14–16)
Gavin Evans – cover photography

Chart

Weekly charts

Year-end charts

Singles

Other charted songs

Certifications

References

1988 albums
Chrysalis Records albums
Nettwerk Records albums
The Proclaimers albums